Valley View Acres may refer to:

Valley View Acres, West Virginia, an unincorporated community in Wood County
Valley View Acres, Sacramento, California, a neighborhood